Avdon (Awdon) is a rural locality (a selo) and the administrative centre of Avdonsky Selsoviet, Ufimsky District, Bashkortostan, Russia. The population was 5,263 as of 2017. There are 20 streets.

Geography 
Avdon is located 30 km southwest of Ufa (the district's administrative centre) by road. Platonovka is the nearest rural locality.

Ethnicity 
The village is inhabited by Tatars, Russians.

References 

Rural localities in Ufimsky District